The Sudbury–White River train, formerly the Lake Superior, informally called the Budd Car, is a Canadian passenger train operated by Via Rail serving communities between Sudbury and White River, Ontario three times a week. The timetable numbers for this train are 185 for the westbound (Sudbury - White River) and 186 for the eastbound (White River - Sudbury).

The train provides flag stop service to many remote locations only accessible by rail on the Canadian Pacific Railway mainline in Northern Ontario. Stops on the line include Amyot, Swanson, Franz, Lochalsh, Missanabie, Dalton, Nicholson, Chapleau, Nemegos, Kormak, Sultan, Biscotasing, Metagama and Benny. 

The typical equipment used on this route is Budd Rail Diesel Car using a RDC-2 and RDC-4, with an extra car added when required, typically on the Victoria Day weekend.

The line figures in 2015 television series on the UK's Channel Five - Chris Tarrant – Extreme Railways.

While train services were disrupted due to the COVID-19 pandemic in Canada, they have returned to the normal 3 train a week schedule as of June 2022.

Route

References

Further reading
  Describes travel on the train route in the early 2000s.

External links
 Train Schedule: White River - Sudbury
 Train Schedule: Sudbury - White River

Passenger rail transport in Ontario
Via Rail routes
Passenger rail transport in Greater Sudbury
Rail transport in Sudbury District
Rail transport in Algoma District